Hosea Morrill Knowlton (May 20, 1847 – December 19, 1902) was a lawyer, District Attorney, and Attorney General of Massachusetts.

References

External links
 New York Times Obituary

Bibliography
 Bridgman, Arthur Milnor (1894), A Souvenir of Massachusetts Legislators 1894, Vol. III, Brockton, Ma: A. M. Bridgman, p. 107.
 Bristol County Bar (April 21, 1903), Hosea Morrill Knowlton Tribute of the Bristol County Bar to the memory of the late Hon. Hosea Morrill Knowlton at Taunton, April 21, 1903, New Bedford, MA: E. Anthony & Sons.
 The Hartford Courant, page 15, December 19, 1902, HOSEA M. KNOWLTON Death of an Ex-Attorney General of Massachusetts.
 The New York Times, page 9,  December 19, 1902, DEATH LIST OF A DAY.; Hosea M. Knowlton.
  Cutter, William Richard (1916), Encyclopedia of Massachusetts, Biographical—Genealogical, Volume VI, New York, N. Y., Boston, Ma: American Historical Society (Inc.), p9. 225-226.
 

1847 births
1902 deaths
Politicians from New Bedford, Massachusetts
People from Durham, Maine
Massachusetts Attorneys General
Republican Party members of the Massachusetts House of Representatives
Republican Party Massachusetts state senators
School board members in Massachusetts
Harvard Law School alumni
People from Marion, Massachusetts
Tufts University alumni
19th-century American politicians